Kozlov's accentor (Prunella koslowi) or the Mongolian accentor, is a species of bird in the family Prunellidae. It is found in Mongolia and northern China.

The specific epithet was chosen to honour the Russian explorer Pyotr Kozlov.

References

External links
 Xeno-canto: audio recordings of Kozlov's accentor

Kozlov's accentor
Birds of Mongolia
Birds of North China
Kozlov's accentor
Taxonomy articles created by Polbot